Besakih Temple (Balinese: ᬧᬸᬭ​ᬩᭂᬲᬓᬶᬄ) is a pura complex in the village of Besakih on the slopes of Mount Agung in eastern Bali, Indonesia. It is the most important, the largest and holiest temple of Balinese Hinduism, and one of a series of Balinese temples. Perched nearly 1000 meters up the side of Gunung Agung, it is an extensive complex of 23 separate but related temples with the largest and most important being Pura Penataran Agung. The temple is built on six levels, terraced up the slope. The entrance is marked by a candi bentar (split gateway), and beyond it the Kori Agung is the gateway to the second courtyard.

History

The precise origins of the temple are unclear but its importance as a holy site almost certainly dates from prehistoric times. The stone bases of Pura Penataran Agung and several other temples resemble megalithic stepped pyramids, which date back at least 2,000 years.

It was certainly used as a Hindu place of worship from 1284 when the first Javanese conquerors settled in Bali. By the 15th century, Besakih had become a state temple of the powerful Gelgel dynasty.

Location
The temple is on the southern slopes of Mount Agung, the principal volcano of Bali.

Architecture

Pura Besakih is a complex made up of twenty-three temples that sit on parallel ridges. It has stepped terraces and flights of stairs which ascend to a number of courtyards and brick gateways that in turn lead up to the main spire or Meru structure, which is called Pura Penataran Agung. All this is aligned along a single axis and designed to lead the spiritual person upward and closer to the mountain which is considered sacred.

The main sanctuary of the complex is the Pura Penataran Agung. The symbolic center of the main sanctuary is the lotus throne, or padmasana, which is therefore the ritual focus of the entire complex. It dates to around the seventeenth century.

A series of eruptions of Mount Agung in 1963, which killed approximately 1,700 people
also threatened Pura Besakih. The lava flows missed the temple complex by mere meters. The saving of the temple is regarded by the Balinese people as miraculous, and a signal from the gods that they wished to demonstrate their power but not destroy the monument the Balinese faithful had erected.

Festivals
Each year there are at least seventy festivals held at the complex, since almost every shrine celebrates a yearly anniversary. This cycle is based on the 210-day Balinese Pawukon calendar year.

It had been nominated as a World Heritage Site as early as 1995, but was pulled out on 2015.

Visitors
In 2013, foreign visitors accounted for 84,368 persons (77.2 percent of all visitors), while domestic visitors accounted for 24,853 persons (22.8 percent).

Controversy
CNN reported that illegal donations were extorted by local youths from surrounding villages and from visiting tourists.

Gallery

See also 

 Indonesian architecture
 Balinese Hinduism

Notes

Further reading 
 I Nyoman Darma Putra and Michael Hitchcock (2005) Pura Besakih: A world heritage site contested in Indonesia and the Malay World, Volume 33, Issue 96 July 2005, pages 225 - 238
 Stuart-Fox, David J.(2002) Pura Besakih: temple, religion and society in Bali KITLV, Original from the University of Michigan (Digitized 5 September 2008 into Google Books) ,  . 470 pages

External links 

 

Balinese temples
Hindu temples in Indonesia
14th-century Hindu temples
Cultural Properties of Indonesia in Bali
Karangasem Regency